Peter Šumi (June 29, 1895 – May 21, 1981) was a Yugoslav gymnast and the founder of the Sava Kranj factory.

Šumi was born in Kranj. He took part in three World Championships in gymnastics for Yugoslavia. At the 1922 World Championships in Ljubljana, he was part of the Yugoslav team that took silver in the team event, behind Czechoslovakia. He also took gold in the individual combined event, as well as gold in the rings, horizontal bar, and parallel bars, and silver in the pommel horse. 

At the next World Championships, in Lyon, France in 1926, he again took silver in the team event, again behind Czechoslovakia. Šumi won the individual combined event for the second time, but won no apparatus medals on this occasion. 

His last World Championship medal came in 1930, at the World Championships in Luxembourg, where he took silver in the pommel horse. He died in Vienna.

Šumi was the only gymnast to have taken individual overall medals in consecutive World Championships until the Chinese gymnast Yang Wei achieved it in 2006 and 2007.  Additionally, Šumi is one of only two repeat male World All-Around Champions (of which there are 7) in the sport of Artistic Gymnastics, along with Yuri Korolyov, never to make an Olympic appearance as a competing athlete.

References

Yugoslav male artistic gymnasts
1895 births
1981 deaths
Slovenian male artistic gymnasts
Sportspeople from Kranj
Medalists at the World Artistic Gymnastics Championships